Lucky is the eighth album by singer-songwriter Melissa Etheridge, released in 2004. Lucky made a debut on Billboard chart at No. 15 with almost 92,000 copies sold.

"Tuesday Morning" is dedicated to the memory of Mark Bingham, his family and friends, paying tribute to all the heroes of 9/11.

Shortly after the album's release, Etheridge was diagnosed with breast cancer and was forced to cancel all promotion to undergo chemotherapy treatments.

Track listing
All songs by Melissa Etheridge, except where noted

"Lucky" – 3:58
"This Moment" (Etheridge, Shanks) – 3:27
"If You Want To" – 3:08
"Breathe" (Armstrong, Dwiggins, Jordan, Randall, Wanninger) – 3:15
"Mercy" (Etheridge, Taylor) – 4:20
"Secret Agent" (Etheridge, Taylor) – 4:52
"Will You Still Love Me" – 4:13
"Meet Me in the Dark" – 5:34
"Tuesday Morning" (Etheridge, Taylor) – 4:49
"Giant" – 5:15
"Come on Out Tonight" – 3:12
"Kiss Me" – 3:54
"When You Find the One" – 4:06

Credits

Personnel
Melissa Etheridge – acoustic guitar, piano, electric guitar, lead vocals
Kenny Aronoff – percussion, drums, tambourine
Bernie Barlow – background vocals ("Mercy")
Jay Bellerose – drums, programming
Mark Browne – bass guitar
Paul Bushnell – bass guitar
Jon Plum – keyboards, programming
Brandi Carlile – background vocals
David Channing – baritone guitar
David N. Cole – keyboards, programming
James Harrah – electric guitar
Ross Hogarth – keyboards
Richard (Rick) Hopkins – Hammond organ
Rami Jaffee – keyboards
Matt Laug – percussion, drums
Kipp Lennon – background vocals
Brian MacLeod – drums
Jamie Muhoberac – keyboards
Dean Parks – acoustic guitar, mandolin, electric guitar
Josh Freese – drums
Blues Saraceno – electric guitar
Eric Schermerhorn – electric guitar
John Shanks – acoustic guitar, electric guitar
Cameron Stone – cello
Jonathan Taylor – programming
Jeffrey C.J. Vanston – bass guitar, keyboards, programming
Patrick Warren – keyboards

Production
Producers: Melissa Etheridge, David N. Cole, Ross Hogarth, Rick Parashar, John Shanks
Engineers: David N. Cole, Marc DeSisto, Ross Hogarth, Terese Joseph, Christian Mack, Rick Parashar, Jeff Rothschild, Mark Valentine
Assistant engineers: Keith Armstrong, Jaime Sickora
Mixing: Ross Hogarth, Chris Lord-Alge, Geoff Ott, Rick Parashar
Digital editing: David Channing, Christian Mack
Tracking assistants: Sergio Chavez, Mark Kiczula, Joey Paradise, Jeremy Parker, Shawn "Fox" Phelps
A&R: Jeff Fenster, Tara Podolsky, Paul Pontius
Production coordination: Steven Girmant
Coordination: Shari Sutcliffe
Assistants: Chris Reynolds, Honchol Sin, Jason Warner
Creative director: Rick Patrick
Art direction: Sara Cumings, Jeri Heiden
Design: Sara Cumings, Jeri Heiden
Illustrations: Tavis Coburn
Photography: Cynthia Daniels

Charts

Singles – Billboard (North America)

References

External links

Melissa Etheridge albums
2004 albums
Albums produced by John Shanks
Albums produced by Rick Parashar
Island Records albums
Albums produced by David N. Cole